On the Connexion of the Physical Sciences, by Mary Somerville, is one of the best-selling science books of the 19th century. The book went through many editions and was translated into several European languages. It is considered one of the first popular science books, containing few diagrams and very little mathematics. It describes astronomy, physics, chemistry, geography, meteorology and electromagnetism as they were scientifically understood at the time.  In a review of the book in March 1834, William Whewell coined the word "scientist".

References

External links

Popular science books
1834 non-fiction books
Books by Mary Somerville
English non-fiction books
English-language books
Scottish books